John Cecil Persons (May 9, 1888 – December 11, 1974) was a lawyer, banker, and highly decorated officer in the United States Army and Alabama National Guard, who is most noted as Commanding general, 31st Infantry Division during World War II.

Persons began his career as lawyer and later served as an Infantry Officer during World War I, when he distinguished himself during the Second Battle of the Marne. He received Distinguished Service Cross, the second highest decoration of the United States Army and remained active in the Alabama National Guard after the War. Following the United States' entry into World War II, Persons commanded 31st Infantry Division "Dixie" in the South West Pacific theatre.

Early career

Civil career
John C. Persons was born on May 9, 1888, in Atlanta, Georgia as the son of William Matthew Persons and Alice Virginia Longshore. Following the high school, Persons moved to Birmingham, Alabama in 1904 and was employed by the Alabama Consolidated Coal and Iron Company as an accountant, before he was admitted to the University of Alabama in summer of 1906. While at the University, he was a member of the Scabbard and Blade, Phi Kappa Sigma and Omicron Delta Kappa and Phi Beta Kappa.

Persons graduated with Bachelor of Laws degree in 1910 and following the admission to the Alabama bar, he began practicing law in Tuscaloosa, Alabama. He also served for a year as Treasurer of the University of Alabama and was appointed city attorney of Tuscaloosa in 1915.

World War I

Following the United States' entry into World War I, Persons enlisted the United States Army and was ordered to the Citizens' Military Training Camp in Plattsburgh, New York for basic training. He was appointed Captain in the Infantry on November 27, 1917, and joined the 47th Infantry Regiment at Camp Syracuse. Persons assumed command of Company "F" and supervised the unit's initial training for upcoming deployment overseas. He was appointed Adjutant of his regiment in February 1918 and embarked for France two months later.

Persons arrived to Brest, France in mid-May 1918 and after two months of additional training, his regiment was assigned to the VII French Army Corps near Bois du Chitelet. When the Germans launched Major offensive on the Marne River on July 15, 1918, the 47th Infantry was located near the town of Thibaud. The telephone lines to the rear had been destroyed by Germans and regimental commander, Colonel Herman Hall ordered Persons to deliver a message to the Brigade commander, Benjamin A. Poore.

Accompanied by Corporal and Private, Persons reached the Poore's headquarters under intense machine gun and rifle fire. He noticed that corporal from his party had been hit by enemy fire and was unable to move. Persons returned to the battlefield and with disregard for his own safety, he carried wounded man to a dressing station in a storm of enemy fire from the enemy lines, saving corporal's life. For this act of valor, he was decorated with the Distinguished Service Cross, the second highest decoration of the United States Army.

He later returned to his regiment and received promotion to Major on September 23, 1918. Following Hall's promotion and succesion by Colonel Troy H. Middleton, Persons remained as his Regiment Adjutant and participated in the combats near Cuisy, Septsarges, and Brieulles-sur-Meuse until the Armistice.

Interwar period

Following the War, Persons returned to the United States and was discharged from the Federal Service on February 19, 1919, and entered the Alabama National Guard with the rank of Major. He subsequently started his own business with establishment of the Persons Lumber Company. He sold lumber for one year, when he entered the banking industry serving successively as vice president of the First National Bank of Tuscaloosa; president of the Traders National Bank in Birmingham, Alabama and president of the American Traders National Bank.

Persons who was promoted to the rank of lieutenant colonel in the Alabama National Guard on June 7, 1924, was appointed president of the First National Bank of Birminghan, and while in this capacity he also held additional responsibility as director of the Birmingham Branch of the Federal Reserve Bank.

On August 27, 1930, Persons was promoted to the rank of brigadier general in the Alabama National Guard and assumed command of the 62nd Infantry Brigade, a part of the 31st Infantry Division "Dixie". His brigade consisted of two Infantry regiments with National Guardsmen from Alabama, Louisiana and Florida and beside the annual summer trainings, Persons led his unit during the providing of protection to the civilians during race riots in Birmingham in early October 1931.

Persons was called up again in May 1937, when his brigade was tasked with relief duty in Bibb and Shelby Counties during hurricane and for flood relief duty at Prattville on April 16–19, 1939. For his service during these events, Persons received commendations from both Alabama and Florida National Guards.

World War II

Training and Mobilization
The 31st Infantry Division including Persons' 62nd Brigade was inducted into active Federal service on November 25, 1940, and following the transfer of the divisional headquarters to Camp Blanding, Florida, Persons supervised the movement of his units from Birmingham. He was appointed Commanding general of the 31st Division shortly afterwards and promoted to the temporary rank of Major general in the United States Army. Persons was then responsible for the division's transformation from "square" infantry division structure into a triangular organization, centered on three instead of four infantry regiments.

After the division's initial train-up period, Persons led it in the Louisiana Maneuvers in August 1941, and continued in the First Army Carolina Maneuvers in October–November 1941. The 31st Division then returned to Camp Blanding, Florida, conducting intensive training until early 1944, when received orders for deployment to the South West Pacific. Partially because Persons complained to his superiors officers, that his division was far better prepared for combat deployment than many less-experienced divisions that were already overseas.

New Guinea

Persons and his division arrived in Oro Bay, New Guinea on April 24, 1944, and engaged in amphibious training prior to entering combat. In early July, parts of the 31st Division were ordered to Aitape, New Guinea, where it took part in the general offensive launched July 13, including the bloody Battle of Driniumor River.

Meanwhile, the remainder of the division relieved the 6th Infantry Division on Wakde, New Guinea, which served as a staging area for a landing near a village of Sarmi on the mainland. Persons assumed duty as commander of Wakde Task Force and launched an offensive against Japanese forces on his perimeter to enlarge his sector. The 31st Division then built bridges, roads, and docks, patrolled the area, and engaged small units of the enemy, trying not to provoke a large scale counterattack by the enemy. Over 1,000 Japanese were killed in these actions.

To prepare for the liberation of the Philippines, General Douglas MacArthur ordered the capture of Morotai Island in the Dutch East Indies to secure a location for airfield, which could be used for the bombing of Japanese positions in the Philippines. Persons led 28,000 men ashore in early morning of September 15, 1944, meeting only light opposition. Despite the extremely difficult conditions on the beaches, he was able to land his troops in few hours and the original Japanese airfield on Morotai was secured before sunset.

However, only eight days later, Persons requested to be relieved of command, what was approved and he relinquished command to Major general Clarence A. Martin. Persons stated that he decided for that due to his five-year absence which threatened his position in the Birmingham Bank, but his subordinates believed he was disappointed when he realized that Army will not promote him to Corps command. He left for the United States, arriving to San Francisco, California in early October 1944.

Persons was given a three-month leave of absence, which was to be followed by his transfer to the inactive status. Before that, he was ordered to Washington, D.C., where he received the Army Distinguished Service Medal from the Chief of Staff, George C. Marshall, for his service with the 31st Infantry Division. Persons underwent a routine examinations at the Walter Reed General Hospital, before retired on January 1, 1945.

Postwar career

Persons returned to Birmingham and took part in the reorganization of the Alabama National Guard for which he was advanced to the rank of Lieutenant general in the Alabama National Guard in June 1948. Persons then continued as the chairman of the board and President of the First National Bank in Birmingham and became respected citizen of Birmingham. In 1972, he was appointed a member of the Alabama Academy of Honor.

General Persons died following a stroke on December 11, 1974, aged 86, in St. Vincent's Hospital in Birmingham, Alabama. He was buried at Elmwood Cemetery there together with his wife, Elonia Dudley Hutchinson. They had together two daughters, Alice Virginia and Elonia.

Decorations

Here is the list of Persons' decorations with ribbon bar:

References

External links
Generals of World War II

1888 births
1974 deaths
People from Atlanta
University of Alabama alumni
United States Army personnel of World War I
United States Army Infantry Branch personnel
Recipients of the Distinguished Service Cross (United States)
Recipients of the Distinguished Service Medal (US Army)
United States Army generals of World War II
United States Army generals
National Guard (United States) generals